The 1978 All-Ireland Minor Football Championship was the 47th staging of the All-Ireland Minor Football Championship, the Gaelic Athletic Association's premier inter-county Gaelic football tournament for boys under the age of 18.

Down entered the championship as defending champions, however, they were defeated in the Ulster Championship.

On 24 September 1978, Mayo won the championship following a 4-9 to 3-8 defeat of Dublin in the All-Ireland final. This was their fourth All-Ireland title overall and their first title in seven championship seasons.

Results

Connacht Minor Football Championship

Quarter-Finals

Semi-Finals

Final

Leinster Minor Football Championship

Preliminary Round
	

Quarter-Finals

Semi-Finals

Final

Ulster Minor Football Championship

Preliminary Round

Quarter-Finals

Semi-Finals

Final

Munster Minor Football Championship

Quarter-Final

Semi-Finals

Final

All-Ireland Minor Football Championship

Semi-Finals

Final

References

1978
All-Ireland Minor Football Championship